The following is a timeline of the history of the city of Trieste in the Friuli-Venezia Giulia region of Italy.

Prior to 19th century

 79 CE – Via Flavia (Dalmatia–Tergeste) built.
 1203 - Captured by the Republic of Venice.
 1320 – Trieste Cathedral built.
 1352 - Public clock installed (approximate date).
 1382 – Trieste becomes a Habsburg imperial free city.
 1385 - Trieste Cathedral consecrated.
 1680 – Castle built.
 1682 – Church of Santa Maria Maggiore built.
 1719 – City becomes a free port.
 1753 – Nautical School founded.
 1755 – Trieste Commodity Exchange established.
 1756 – Canal Grande (Trieste) constructed.
 1776 – Karl von Zinzendorf becomes governor of Trieste.
 1783 – Jewish primary school opens.
 1784 –  newspaper begins publication.
 1787 - Greek Orthodox Church of San Nicolò dei Greci built.
 1793 – Pubblica Biblioteca Arcadica Triestina (library) established.

19th century
 1801 – Teatro Nuovo (opera house) inaugurated.
 1809 – Trieste ceded to the French as part of the Illyrian Provinces in the Treaty of Schönbrunn.
 1810
 Gabinetto di Minerva literary society founded.
 Population: 29,908.
 1814 – Austrians returned to power in the Treaty of Paris.
 1828 – Catholic Diocese of Trieste-Koper established.
 1831 – Assicurazioni Generali insurance company in business.
 1833 – Österreichischer Lloyd shipping firm in business.
 1835 – Schiller Society founded.
 1839
 Caffe degli Specchi in business.
 Mutius von Tommasini becomes mayor.
 1840 – Tergesteo built.
 1842 – Civico Orto Botanico di Trieste (garden) and Savings Bank of Trieste established.
 1846 – Civico Museo di Storia Naturale di Trieste (museum) established.
 1848
 May to Aug - Harbour blockaded by an Italian fleet.
 25 October: Premiere of Verdi's opera Il corsaro.
 1849 – Trieste becomes a Habsburg imperial free city again.
 1851 – Trieste Astronomical Observatory established.
 1853 – Trieste Chamber of Commerce and Industry established.
 1857
 Austrian Southern Railway (Vienna-Trieste) begins operating.
 Trieste Centrale railway station opens.
 Stabilimento Tecnico Triestino shipbuilding firm in business near city.
 1860 – Miramare Castle built near city for Austrian archduke Maximilian.
 1871 – Richard Burton becomes British consul in Trieste.
 1872 – Revoltella Museum founded.
 1878 – Politeama Rossetti theatre built.
 1880 – Population: 144,844.
 1881 – Il Piccolo newspaper begins publication.
 1882
 September: Emperor of Austria Franz Joseph I visits city.
 Agricultural exhibition held.
 1883 – Harbour constructed.
 1885 – Saint Spyridon Church building inaugurated.
 1887 – Trieste–Hrpelje railway begins operating.
 1888 - Monument erected to commemorate 500th anniversary of connexion with Austria.
 1891 – City ended being a free port.
 1899 – Circolo di Studi Sociali (civic group) founded.
 1900 – Population: 132,879.

20th century

 1902 – Trieste–Opicina tramway begins operating.
 1904 – Trieste National Hall opens.
 1905 – Coffee exchange established.
 1906 - Opening of the Karawanks Tunnel (railway) completed the railway from Trieste to Klagenfurt.
 1912
 Synagogue of Trieste completed.
 Circolo Sportivo Ponziana (football club) formed.
 Savoia Excelsior Palace hotel in business.
 1914 – Caffè San Marco in business.
 1918
 Unione Triestina football club formed.
 La Nazione newspaper begins publication.
 Umana literary journal begins publication.
 1919 – Trieste becomes part of the Kingdom of Italy per Treaty of Saint-Germain-en-Laye.
 1920 – 13 July: Trieste National Hall burnt by Fascist Blackshirts.
 1924 – University of Trieste and Rotary Club established.
 1927 – Vittoria Lighthouse built.
 1930 – Cantieri Riuniti dell'Adriatico shipbuilding firm in business.
 1931 – Radio Trst begins broadcasting.
 1932 – Stadio Littorio opens.
 1943
 September: Nazi German Operational Zone of the Adriatic Littoral headquartered in Trieste.
 September: City becomes part of the Italian Social Republic.
 Risiera di San Sabba Nazi concentration camp established near city.
 1945
 1 May: City taken by Yugoslav forces.
 2 May: German surrender to Allied forces.
 Primorski dnevnik Slovene-language newspaper begins publication.
 1947 – 15 September: City becomes part of the Free Territory of Trieste of the United Nations Security Council.
 1949
 June: Municipal election held.
 Gianni Bartoli becomes mayor.
 Museo Sartorio opens.
 1953 – Administration of Free Territory of Trieste passes to Italy.
 1954 – Some of Trieste becomes part of Italy; the remainder becomes part of Yugoslavia.
 1958 – Mario Franzil becomes mayor.
 1961 – Trieste – Friuli Venezia Giulia Airport in operation.
 1963 – Orto Botanico dell'Università di Trieste (garden) established.
 1964 – International Centre for Theoretical Physics headquartered near city.
 1965 – Temple of Monte Grisa (church) built near city.
 1970 – City becomes capital of the Friuli-Venezia Giulia region (approximate date).
 1975 – Protest against Treaty of Osimo.
 1978 – International School for Advanced Studies established.
 1992 – Stadio Nereo Rocco opens.
 1993
 Riccardo Illy becomes mayor.
 Elettra Sincrotrone Trieste research centre established near city.
 1996 – Central European Initiative headquartered in Trieste.

21st century

 2001 – Roberto Dipiazza becomes mayor.
 2006 – Italia Marittima shipping firm active.
 2011
 Roberto Cosolini becomes mayor.
 Population: 205,535.

See also
 History of Trieste (it)
 Other names of Trieste
 List of presidents of Friuli-Venezia Giulia region since 1960s
 List of mayors of Trieste

Timelines of other cities in the macroregion of Northeast Italy:(it)
 Emilia-Romagna region: Timeline of Bologna; Ferrara; Forlì; Modena; Parma; Piacenza; Ravenna; Reggio Emilia; Rimini
 Trentino-South Tyrol region: Timeline of Bolzano; Trento
 Veneto region: Timeline of Padua; Treviso; Venice; Verona; Vicenza

References

This article incorporates information from the German Wikipedia and Italian Wikipedia.

Bibliography

Published in the 19th century
 
 
 
 
 
 * 

 
 
  + part 2

Published in the 20th century
 
  (profusely illustrated)
 

 
 

 

 Angelo Ara, Claudio Magris. Trieste. Un'identità di frontiera. Einaudi Editore. Torino, 1982.

Published in the 21st century
in English

 Morris, Jan. Trieste and the Meaning of Nowhere. DaCapo Press. Cambridge, Mass, 2001
 
 
 
 
 

in Italian
 Franco Gleria and Maurizio Radacich. Il terrore viene dal cielo. Trieste: 1944/1945 (Trieste: Italo Svevo Edizioni, 2007)

External links

 Map of Trieste, 1999
 Europeana. Items related to Trieste, various dates.

 
trieste
trieste